Nations Cultures - Muslims is a documentary film series. In these series, different countries were visited by the director group, the countries included: England, France, the Netherlands, Belgium, Switzerland, Sudan, Ethiopia, Kenya, Guinea, Mali and Senegal. The cultural, social and historical situations were considered and the life and culture of Muslims in their countries were analyzed.

Technical specifications and film-crew 

Betacam SP, 45mins,  In 26 parts, Documentary, Iran, 1994 - 1997
Researcher, Script writer and Director: Mahmoud Shoolizadeh,
Photographer: Mohammad Taher Jam,
Narrator: Parviz Bahram,
Edit: Mahmoud Shoolizadeh, Ghasemi, Nakhostin Maher,
Music: Mohammad Reza Aligholi.
Producer: Abdolhamid Arjmand and Mostafa Izadi, (I.R.I.B., Channel 1)

See also
 List of Islamic films

Persian-language films
Documentary films about Islam
Iranian documentary films